Cameron McLean (born 14 December 1967) is an Australian former racing driver.

Career 
McLean began racing at age 14 in karts. He came to prominence when he won the 1995 Australian Sports Sedan Championship in a BMW M3. McLean won the 1997 and 1998 Privateers’ Cup in the Australian Super Touring Championship. In 1999 he moved to the V8 Supercars category with Greenfield Mowers Racing, winning the Privateers award in the 1999 Shell Championship Series. From there, he raced in selected events, but was always a regular in the endurance races. For 2001 and 2002, he drove for private team Paragon Motorsports, but was never able to land a full-time drive with a professional outfit. McLean drove with a number of different leading teams in the enduros, including Dick Johnson Racing, Kmart Racing, Stone Brothers Racing, Ford Performance Racing and Garry Rogers Motorsport. His best V8 Supercar result came in the 2004 Sandown 500 where he finished second for Stone Brothers Racing, driving with Russell Ingall. McLean also finished fourth in the 2001 Bathurst 1000 with Greg Ritter, driving for Dick Johnson Racing.

Career results

Complete Bathurst 1000 results

* Super Touring race

References

External links
 Super Touring register 
 Driver Database stats
 Racing reference profile

Living people
1967 births
Racing drivers from Brisbane
Garry Rogers Motorsport drivers
Supercars Championship drivers